The Madiun River ( or Kali Madiun) is a river in East Java, Indonesia, about 500 km to the east of the capital Jakarta. It is the largest tributary of the Solo River. Its name indicates that it passes through the major city of Madiun, East Java, Indonesia. This river starts as a number of smaller tributaries converging near the city of Ponorogo, in particular the Kali Slahung, Kali Keyang and Kali Sungkur. It eventually converges with the Solo River near the city of Ngawi.

Historical note 
In 1825, the Dutch East Indies soldiers built a fortress near the convergence of the Madiun and Solo rivers, to fight a local rebellion led by Diponegoro. The fortress was named Fort Van Den Bosch; known locally as Benteng Pendem Ngawi.

Geography 
The river flows entirely within the Province of East Java, passing through Ponorogo Regency, Madiun Regency, City of Madiun, Magetan Regency and Ngawi Regency, with savanna climate. The annual average temperature in the area is 26 °C. The warmest month is October, when the average temperature is around 30 °C, and the coldest is January, at 24 °C. The wettest month is March, with an average of 546 mm rainfall, and the driest is September, with 21 mm rainfall.

For ages the Madiun River has notoriously caused flooding during the rainy season. 
Every year the seasonal deluge submerges many fields and houses along the river banks, including some districts in Ponorogo Regency in the upper reaches and in the Ngawi Regency in the lower reaches. The high debit of water overflows to the Solo River, adding to the regular flooding in Bojonegoro Regency. During the dry season, the river becomes a touristic place for fishing, or a place to mine sands for local people.

Tourism 
 Wana Wisata Grape at the Catur river (Grape river).

See also
List of rivers of Indonesia
List of rivers of Java

References

External links 
  p. 13. Using Madiun River as background.
 

Madiun
Rivers of East Java
Rivers of Indonesia